Victor Catteau (born 18 September 1995) is a French politician from the National Rally who was elected member of the National Assembly for Nord's 5th constituency in the 2022 French legislative election.

See also 

 List of deputies of the 16th National Assembly of France

References 

Living people
1995 births
21st-century French politicians

University of Lille Nord de France alumni
National Rally (France) politicians
Deputies of the 16th National Assembly of the French Fifth Republic
Members of Parliament for Nord